Litania is the Latin term for litany, the plural is litaniae.

Litania may also refer to:
Books
Litania (1952), collection of poems by Werner Aspenström

Music
Litaniae,  compositions by Wolfgang Amadeus Mozart
Litania, composition by Heinrich Schütz SWV 458
Litania, composition by Friedrich Funcke
Litania, composition by Carin Malmlöf-Forssling 
Litania, composition by Jeffrey Lewis (composer) (1993)
 Litania: Music of Krzysztof Komeda, album by Polish jazz trumpeter and composer Tomasz Stańko
Litania, album by Jacek Kaczmarski 1986
Litania, album  by Margaret Leng Tan
Litania, album  by Giovanni Lindo Ferretti 2004

See also
Litany (disambiguation)